The modern constellation Pictor lies across one of the quadrants symbolized by the Vermillion Bird of the South (南方朱雀, Nán Fāng Zhū Què) and The Southern Asterisms (近南極星區, Jìnnánjíxīngōu), that divide the sky in traditional Chinese uranography.

The name of the western constellation in modern Chinese is 繪架座 (huì jià zuò), meaning "the easel constellation".

Stars
The map of Chinese constellation in constellation Pictor area consists of :

See also
Traditional Chinese star names
Chinese constellations

References

External links
 香港太空館研究資源
 中國星區、星官及星名英譯表
 天象文學
 台灣自然科學博物館天文教育資訊網
 中國古天文
 中國古代的星象系統

Astronomy in China
Pictor (constellation)